John Livingston (19 September 1857 – 4 September 1935) was an Australian politician. He was a member of the South Australian House of Assembly from 1899 to 1906, and a member of the Australian House of Representatives from 1906 to 1922.

Livingston was born in Mount Gambier, South Australia and educated privately at the family home of Curratum.  He worked on farms in New South Wales, Queensland and Victoria and in 1880 explored the Gascoyne River area of northern Western Australia.  He married Eliza Dunn Paltridge on 11 June 1884 at the home of her father William Paltridge at Compton, South Australia. In 1898, he auction house in Mount Gambier and he became mayor of Mount Gambier in 1899.
  
In 1899, Livingston was elected as the member for Victoria in the South Australian House of Assembly and retained the seat after it was renamed to Victoria and Albert in 1902 but lost the seat in 1906.

Livingston won the federal seat of Barker at the 1906 election for the Anti-Socialist Party.  From 1909 to 1916 he was a member for the Commonwealth Liberal Party, and from 1916 to 1922 he was a member for the Nationalist Party of Australia.  He was a consistent opponent of the construction of Canberra.

Livingston died in Melbourne in 1935 (aged77), survived by his wife, five daughters and two sons.

Notes

Free Trade Party members of the Parliament of Australia
Commonwealth Liberal Party members of the Parliament of Australia
Nationalist Party of Australia members of the Parliament of Australia
Members of the Australian House of Representatives for Barker
Members of the Australian House of Representatives
Members of the South Australian House of Assembly
Mayors of places in South Australia
Explorers of Western Australia
1857 births
1935 deaths
20th-century Australian politicians